Smbat VI Bagratuni (ca. 670 – 726) was a member of the Bagratuni family who was presiding prince of Armenia from 691 to 711. During his reign, he frequently shifted alliances between the Byzantines, who gave him the title of kouropalates, and the Umayyads. He was the son of Varaz-Tirots III Bagratuni, and the uncle of Ashot III Bagratuni. 

670s births
726 deaths
Smbat
People of the Arab–Byzantine wars
7th-century Armenian people
8th-century Armenian people
Smbat
Kouropalatai